Kœnigsmacker (Lorraine Franconian: Maacher/Kinneksmaacher) is a commune in the Moselle department in Grand Est in north-eastern France.

Kœnigsmacker was the birthplace of Father Jean-Vincent Scheil (1858–1940), a French Dominican scholar and Assyriologist, who was one of the discoverers of the Code of Hammurabi in Persia. The area was the scene of fighting during World War II when the U.S. 90th Infantry Division assaulted the nearby Fort de Koenigsmacker, one of the German Moselstellung fortresses.

See also
 Communes of the Moselle department

References

External links

 Monuments of Kœnigsmacker 

Koenigsmacker